Psilaxis radiatus is a species of sea snail, a marine gastropod mollusk in the family Architectonicidae, which are known as the staircase shells or sundials.

Description
Psilaxis radiatus has a shell that reaches 26 mm.

Distribution
This species can be found in the Indo-Pacific, from the Red Sea and South Africa via Japan, Indonesia, the Philippines and eastern Australia to Hawaii.

References

External links
 

Architectonicidae
Gastropods described in 1798